A special election was held in the U.S. state of Minnesota on February 9, 2016, to elect a new representative for District 50B in the Minnesota House of Representatives, caused by the resignation of Representative Ann Lenczewski, effective on December 15, 2015. As only one candidate each filed for the nomination of the Republican Party of Minnesota and Minnesota Democratic–Farmer–Labor Party (DFL), a primary election was not held. Chad Anderson, the Republican nominee, won the special election.

Candidates

Republican Party of Minnesota
The Senate District 50 Republican Party held a convention to endorse a candidate on December 12, 2015. Chad Anderson won the endorsement over Sanu Patel-Zellinger after a single ballot.

 Chad Anderson, real estate broker

Withdrawn
 Sanu Patel-Zellinger

Minnesota Democratic–Farmer–Labor Party
The Senate District 50 Democratic–Farmer–Labor Party endorsed Andrew Carlson on December 14, 2015.

 Andrew Carlson, Bloomington two-term City Council member

Results

Previous election results

See also
 List of special elections to the Minnesota House of Representatives

References

External links
 Information on the special election at the Minnesota Secretary of State website

2016 Minnesota elections
Minnesota special elections